Silphium brachiatum is a species of flowering plant in the family Asteraceae known commonly as Cumberland rosinweed. It is a rare member of the genus Silphium and is native to the southern Cumberland Plateau where it is found in only a few counties of Alabama, Georgia, and Tennessee. It was described by Augustin Gattinger, the first state botanist of Tennessee.

References

brachiatum